Ostritz is a town in the district Görlitz, in Saxony, Germany. It is situated on the border with Poland, on the left bank of the Lusatian Neisse, 16 km south of Görlitz.

It was the scene of a small battle in the Seven Years' War, described in a contemporary journal as follows: On 31st December 1756 a picket of Prince Heinrich's Regiment under the command of Major Heinrich von Blumenthal, which had been sent out from Zittau to Ostritz, was attacked by 500 Croats who, notwithstanding their numerical superiority were thoroughly beaten off. The Croats got right into the town and set fire to some houses, but the fires were put out. The most serious loss on the Prussian side was the brave Major von Blumenthal, who fell right at the beginning of the action.

In recent years, the town has become known for its efforts in recycling and ecological renewable energy.

It is also located next to the thirteenth century Cistercian nunnery, St. Marienthal Abbey, which is still functioning.

One curious fact about the town is that due to territorial changes after the Second World War its railway station lies in the Polish village of Krzewina. It is part of the Görlitz-Zittau train line.

Incidents 
The "Shield and Sword" festival (or "SS Festival" for short) was launched on 20 April 2018 commemorating Adolf Hitler's birthday and was opposed by the Ostritz Peace Festival established by local residents. In 2019, a court in Dresden imposed a ban on the sale or possession of alcohol at the Schild and Schwert Festival. Police confiscated thousands of litres of beer and local residents bought up the entire stock from the local supermarket.

References

Populated places in Görlitz (district)